Bernhard Buhmann (born 1979 in Bregenz, Austria) is an Austrian painter. He has a master's degree in Sociology (M.Sc Sociology) and Communication Science from the University of Vienna and is currently studying painting at the University of Applied Arts Vienna.

He is represented by Carbon 12 Dubai.

Selected exhibitions

2009
Spielwiese, Strabag Kunstforum, Vienna

2008
Sneak Preview, Carbon 12 Gallery, Dubai
Museum of Contemporary Art, Bukarest | MOYA, Vienna

2007
Gesellschafter Artaward, Artfair 21, Cologne
Anna, Arsch und Friedrich, Kunstverein Vorarlberg, Villa Claudia, Feldkirch
Bernhard Buhmann, IZD Tower, Museum of Young Art, Vienna
The Essence, Museum angewandter Kunst, Vienna
Gender Art Lab, Wittgensteinhaus, Vienna
Sans Serif, Produzentengalerie Praterstraße 15, Vienna
Bernhard Buhmann und Gernot Petjak, Museum of Young Art, Vienna

2006
Zeitgenössische Positionen, Galerie am Lidlweg, Neulengbach
The Essence 06, Museum angewandter Kunst, Vienna

2005
Junge Kunst, Galerie Mashart, Hohenems
Malstrom, Universität für angewandte Kunst, Vienna

2004
Malerei04, Universität für angewandte Kunst, Vienna
Nestle Kunstförderung, Sammlung Essl, Klosterneuburg
Siemens Art Lab, Vienna

1998
Segmente, Hohenems

Awards

2008
Preisträger des STRABAG Art Award

2007
Gewinner des Gesellschafter Art Award, Art fair 21, Cologne
Fohn-Stipendium, Vienna

2004
Nestle- Kunstförderung
Austria Card Förderpreis

External links
 Bernhard Buhmann
 Carbon 12 Dubai

Living people
1979 births
20th-century Austrian painters
Austrian male painters
21st-century Austrian painters
21st-century male artists
20th-century Austrian male artists